The 2011–12 Ulster Rugby season was Ulster's 18th season since the advent of professionalism in rugby union, and their third under head coach Brian McLaughlin. They competed in the Heineken Cup and the inaugural Pro12, successor competition to the Celtic League.

They finished sixth in the Pro12, and qualified for next season's Champions Cup as the third highest placed Irish team. Scrum-half Ruan Pienaar, lock Dan Tuohy and prop BJ Botha made the Pro12 Dream Team. They finished second in their pool in the Heineken Cup, beat Edinburgh in the semi-final, and lost to Leinster in the final. Out-half Ian Humphreys was Ulster's top scorer with 168 points. Wings Andrew Trimble and Craig Gilroy were joint top try scorers with six each. Flanker Chris Henry was Player of the Year. Craig Gilroy won the IRUPA Try of the Year award.

Brian McLaughlin, who was coaching Ulster while on sabbatical from his regular job as a teacher at Royal Belfast Academical Institution, stood to lose his teaching position and pension if he extended his contract with Ulster any further, and as head coach risked losing his job at any time. Director of rugby David Humphreys decided to offer him the security of a full-time position coaching the academy, and to replace him as head coach with Mark Anscombe.

Staff

Squad

Senior squad

Players in (Season 2011/2012)
Lewis Stevenson from Harlequins
Callum Black from Worcester
Mike McComish from Connacht
John Afoa from Auckland Blues
Jared Payne from Auckland Blues
Stefan Terblanche from The Sharks (On 3 Month Deal)

Players out (Season 2011/2012)
 Niall O'Connor to Connacht
 Mark McCrea to Connacht
 Ryan Caldwell to Bath
 BJ Botha to Munster Rugby
 T. J. Anderson to Connacht
 Tommy Seymour to Glasgow Warriors
 Jamie Smith to Newport Gwent Dragons

Academy squad

Heineken Cup

Pool 4

Quarter-final

Semi-finals

Final

Pro12

End-of-season awards
2011–2012 Dream Team

Ulster Ravens

British and Irish Cup

Pool C

Home attendance

Ulster Rugby Awards
The Ulster Rugby Awards ceremony was held at the Culloden Hotel on 10 May 2012. Winners were:

Ulster Player of the Year: Chris Henry
Ulster Rugby Personality of the Year: Stephen Ferris
Young Player of the Year: Craig Gilroy
Supporters Club Player of the Year: Pedrie Wannenburg
Academy Player of the Year: Chris Farrell
Most Improved Player of the Year: Paul Marshall
Dorrington B. Faulkner Award: John Wilson
Youth Player of the Year: Russell Blair
Schools Player of the Year: James Harrison
Club Player of the Year: Richard Lutton
Club of the Year: Malone RFC

References

2011-12
2011–12 in Irish rugby union
2011–12 Pro12 by team
2011–12 Heineken Cup by team